The Paschal troparion or Christos anesti (Greek:  Χριστός ἀνέστη) is the characteristic troparion for the celebration of Pascha (Easter) in the Byzantine Rite.

Like most troparia, it is a brief stanza often used as a refrain between the verses of a psalm, but is also used on its own. It is sung in the first plagal (or fifth) tone. Its author or date is unknown.

Text

The first line paraphrases from 1 Corinthians 15:20 (Νυνὶ δὲ Χριστὸς ἐγήγερται ἐκ νεκρῶν). The troparion is part of the Paschal Divine Liturgy of the Byzantine Rite, and it was certainly in use in the 5th or 6th century. Its ultimate origin is unknown; Metropolitan Hilarion (Alfeyev) (2009) has suggested a 2nd-century origin.

Usage
According to the testimony of the Jerusalem tropologion (or iadgari, an ancient hymnography surviving only in a Georgian translation of the 8th century), the troparion was sung at the end of the Easter Vigil in  the late ancient Jerusalem Easter liturgy. Based on the Typikon of the Great Church, the troparion was part of the nonmonastic liturgy at the Hagia Sophia by the 10th century.

In Finland, the Orthodox Church of Finland is a minority church. However, the Orthodox Easter night has, for many decades, been broadcast annually on radio and television, and thus the troparion has gradually become well known to non-Orthodox Finns. In 1986, the Evangelical Lutheran Church of Finland—the largest religious denomination in the country—included the troparion in its revised official hymn book, where it is hymn number 90, as an Easter hymn. It is recommended to be sung three times in succession.

References

External links
 Paschal Troparion - Christ is Risen in English and Slavonic and Greek English transliteration
 Paschal Troparion in transliteration
 Orthodox Church of America Pascha Music Downloads
 Paschal Troparion in  Four Languages with music

Genres of Byzantine music
Easter liturgy
Byzantine music
Eastern Christian hymns
Texts in Koine Greek
Byzantine Rite